Turbinaria bifrons, commonly known as disc coral, is a species of colonial stony coral in the family Dendrophylliidae. It is native to the Indo-Pacific region. It is a zooxanthellate coral that houses symbiont dinoflagellates in its tissues. This is an uncommon species and the International Union for Conservation of Nature has rated its conservation status as being "vulnerable".

Description
Turbinaria bifrons is a zooxanthellate hermatypic coral and its tissues contain symbiont dinoflagellates. Its colonies begin as thin layers that become bifacial fronds that are vertical and elongated. It has conical corallites with regular shapes and sizes. The coral is mostly brown, green or grey in colour.

Distribution
It is classed as a vulnerable species on the IUCN Red List and it is believed that its population is decreasing in line with the global decline of coral reefs; the species is also listed under Appendix II of CITES. Figures of its population are unknown, but is likely to be threatened by the global reduction of coral reefs, the increase of temperature causing coral bleaching, climate change, human activity, parasites, and disease. This uncommon species occurs in the eastern Indian Ocean, Australia, Japan, the South China Sea, and the northwestern, southwestern, and western central Pacific Ocean.

Taxonomy
It was described as Turbinaria bifrons by Brüggemann in 1877. It is also known by synonyms Turbinaria aequalis, Turbinaria dendrophyllia, Turbinaria gracilis, and Turbinaria nidifera.

References

Dendrophylliidae
Corals described in 1877
Taxa named by Friedrich Brüggemann